Dario Gjergja (born 21 August 1975) is a Croatian-Belgian professional basketball coach who currently serves as the head coach for Oostende and the Belgium national team.

Coaching career
Gjergja signed with Telenet BC Oostende in December 2011. He was named the Coach of the Year in Belgium for the 2012–13 season. In May 2014, he extended his contract for 3 more years. In February 2017, Gjergja extended his contract with Telenet Oostende for another four years.

National team coaching career
Gjergja served as an assistant coach of the Croatia national team during EuroBasket 2015, under the coaching staff of the head coach, Velimir Perasović. 

In September 2018, he was named the head coach of the Belgium national team. He also gained Belgian citizenship.

References

1975 births
Living people
Croatian basketball coaches
Croatian expatriate basketball people in Belgium
Croatian expatriate basketball people in Russia
Belgian basketball coaches
Belgian people of Croatian descent
BC Oostende coaches
Liège Basket coaches
Naturalised citizens of Belgium
Sportspeople from Zadar
Naturalised sports competitors
Basketball coaches of international teams